Karen Stevenson (born 30 July 1993) is a Dutch judoka.

She is the silver medalist of the 2021 Judo Grand Slam Tbilisi in the -78 kg category. 

She lost her bronze medal match in her event at the 2022 Judo Grand Slam Tel Aviv held in Tel Aviv, Israel.

On 12 November 2022 she won a silver medal at the 2022 European Mixed Team Judo Championships as part of team Netherlands.

References

External links
 
 

1993 births
Living people
Dutch female judoka
People from Heiloo
Sportspeople from North Holland
21st-century Dutch women